Ocean Lakes High School (OLHS) is a public high school in Virginia Beach, Virginia, and is located in the city's southeastern section.

Math and Science Academy
A notable feature of Ocean Lakes high school is the Math and Science Academy, started in 1996 as the first of several magnet programs in Virginia Beach.  Students throughout Virginia Beach who are interested in a math and science education can apply for admission to the academy.  Students Enrolled in the academy take advanced courses in math, science, and English. By graduation, seniors in the Math and Science Academy must take at least calculus in math, and complete a "senior project". The senior project requires the student to either conduct a mentorship or research project in a math or science field. The student must then write either three case studies or a research paper and give a PowerPoint presentation on the work accomplished. Entry in the program requires completion of Algebra I prior to enrollment, positive instructor recommendations, above average grades, and excellent performance on an aptitude test.

Ranking and critical response
Ocean Lakes is one of five Virginia Beach high schools ranked in the top 1200 in Newsweek 2006 ranking of American high schools.

Clubs and organizations

Sports
Ocean Lakes students participate in the following sports:
Fall- cheerleading, cross country, field hockey, football, golf, volleyball, marching band
Winter- cheerleading, basketball, gymnastics, wrestling, indoor track, swimming/diving
Spring- baseball, soccer, tennis, track, softball, lacrosse

Eligibility requirements
Must currently be enrolled in not fewer than five subjects.
Must have passed five subjects the year/semester preceding participation.
Must have a 2.0 GPA the semester preceding participation.
Must have not reached the age of 19 on or before the first day of August of the current year.
Must have a current school athletic physical form dated after May 1, 2019. Physicals should be turned in prior to tryout day on a VHSL form.

Cheerleading
In 2006, the competition cheerleading team won the Beach District and regional competitions and were competitors in the state competition.
In 2007, the competition cheerleading team placed 2nd in the Beach District, 4th in the Eastern Region, and 6th in the state competitions.
In 2008, the competition cheerleading team placed 1st in Beach District and finished in 5th in Eastern Region.

Scholastic Bowl
The 1999-2000 team was Ocean Lakes' most successful team to that point, placing fourth in the VHSL tournament. Today, Ocean Lakes remains successful in Scholastic Bowl, placing second to Thomas Jefferson High School for Science and Technology in the Group AAA state Tournament for the 2005–06 season.

Wrestling
The 2011-2012 Dolphins team placed first in the Beach District and Eastern Regional Tournaments. They later proceeded to place 6th in the AAA State Tournament. They also won the Virginia Duals American High School Division.

Football
In 2012, the Dolphins football team advanced to the VHSL State Championship game but lost to L.C. Bird, 14–10. In 2014, Ocean Lakes returned to the championship game and defeated Centerville in overtime, 30–24.

Swimming/Diving
The 2020-2021 boys team became the fourth state champion team in Ocean Lakes history defeating second-place W. T. Woodson High School by 11.5 points. This marked the first win by a Beach District team since 2012.

Notable alumni
Bill Bray - baseball player
Mike Ballard - baseball player 
Marcus Davis - football player 
Randall Dunn - football player
Eli Harold - football player
 Helen Hou-Sandí - software engineer with significant contributions to WordPress and GitHub; accomplished pianist
Justin Hunter - football player
Scotty McGee - football player
Shamarko Thomas - football player
 Shawn Morimando - MLB pitcher for the Cleveland Guardians
 Derrick Nnadi - football player, Super Bowl LIV Champion
 Levonta Taylor - football player

See also
AAA Eastern Region
AAA Beach District

References

 School Report Card
 Ocean Lakes HS official site
 Ocean Lakes Student Handbook

External links
 School Report Card
 Virginia Beach City Public Schools
 Virginia Beach school mascots and colors

Educational institutions established in 1994
Magnet schools in Virginia
High schools in Virginia Beach, Virginia
Public high schools in Virginia
1994 establishments in Virginia